The Glen and Addie Crabtree Cabin was built in 1928. It was listed on the National Register of Historic Places in 2000.

It is a rustic log cabin, with original portion  in plan.  It was expanded in 1950.  It was moved to its current location in 1997..

References

Log cabins
National Register of Historic Places in Fremont County, Idaho
Buildings and structures completed in 1929